The fish market on the coast in the western part of Nouakchott, Mauritania is a bustling centre. It is described by Lonely Planet as "incredibly lively and extremely colorful" and having "teams of men, mostly Wolof and Fula, dragging in heavy hand-knotted fishing nets and small boys hurrying back and forth with trays of fish".

References

Retail markets in Mauritania
Nouakchott